Snowpack forms from layers of snow that accumulate in geographic regions and high elevations where the climate includes cold weather for extended periods during the year. Snowpacks are an important water resource that feed streams and rivers as they melt. Therefore, snowpacks are both the drinking water source for many communities and a potential source of flooding (in case of sudden melting). Snowpacks also contribute mass to glaciers in their accumulation zone.

Assessing the formation and stability of snowpacks is important in the study and prediction of avalanches.  Scientists study the physical properties of snow under different conditions and their evolution, and more specifically snow metamorphism, snow hydrology (that is, the contribution of snow melt to catchment hydrology), the evolution of snow cover with climate change and its effect on the ice–albedo feedback and hydrology, both on the ground and by using remote sensing. Snow is also studied in a more global context of impact on animal habitats and plant succession. An important effort is put into snow classification, both as a hydrometeor and on the ground.

Scientific applications

Snowpack modeling is done for snow stability, flood forecasting, water resource management, and climate studies. Snowpack modeling is either done by simple, statistical methods such as degree day or complex, physically based energy balance models such as the SNOWPACK model, the CROCUS model or SNOWMODEL.

See also
Advection
Glacial period
Glacier mass balance
Hydrology
Subnivean climate

References

External links
 SNOWPACK
 CROCUS
 SnowModel

Avalanches
Snow